Yasser Ibrahim Ahmed El Hanafi (born 10 February 1993) is an Egyptian footballer who plays for Al Ahly as a centre back.

In January 2019, he moved to Al Ahly.

Career statistics

Club

Honours

Club
Zamalek
 Egypt Cup: 2013–14

Al Ahly
 Egyptian Premier League: 2018–19, 2019–20
 Egypt Cup: 2019–20
 Egyptian Super Cup: 2018–19
 CAF Champions League: 2019–20, 2020–21
 CAF Super Cup: 2021 (May), 2021 (December)

International
Egypt U20
 Africa U-20 Cup of Nations: 2013

Individual
FIFA Club World Cup top scorer: 2021

References

Profile on Goalzz

1993 births
Living people
Egyptian footballers
Zamalek SC players
Association football defenders
2013 African U-20 Championship players
Egypt youth international footballers
Place of birth missing (living people)
Egyptian Premier League players